Imre Hódos (January 10, 1928 in Hajdúnánás – April 23, 1989 in Debrecen) was a Hungarian wrestler and Olympic champion in Greco-Roman wrestling.

Olympics
Hódos competed at the 1952 Summer Olympics in Helsinki where he received a gold medal in Greco-Roman wrestling, the bantamweight class. He also competed at the 1956 Summer Olympics and the 1960 Summer Olympics.

References

External links
 

1928 births
1989 deaths
Olympic wrestlers of Hungary
Wrestlers at the 1952 Summer Olympics
Wrestlers at the 1956 Summer Olympics
Wrestlers at the 1960 Summer Olympics
Hungarian male sport wrestlers
Olympic gold medalists for Hungary
People from Hajdúnánás
Olympic medalists in wrestling
Medalists at the 1952 Summer Olympics
Sportspeople from Hajdú-Bihar County
20th-century Hungarian people